The Thomas Walters House, near Hodgenville, Kentucky, was built around 1880.  It was listed on the National Register of Historic Places in 1991.

It is a two-story, five bay house with elements of Italianate style.  It was built upon stone piers, has three interior brick chimneys, and has a hipped roof.  Up to 1990, the house had not much been altered, besides the addition of modern aluminum siding.

It is located on U.S. Route 31E north of Magnolia.

References

Historic districts on the National Register of Historic Places in Kentucky
National Register of Historic Places in LaRue County, Kentucky
Italianate architecture in Kentucky
Houses completed in 1880
1880 establishments in Kentucky